Broken In is the third album by American country music singer Trent Willmon. It was released in February 2008 on the independent Compadre Records label. None of its singles — the title track, "There Is a God" or "Cold Beer and a Fishing Pole" — entered the Hot Country Songs charts. The track "It Doesn't Mean I Don't Love You" was previously recorded by the duo McHayes, whose version from their unreleased 2003 album Lessons in Lonely was a #41-peaking country single in 2003.

Two of the album's songs were later recorded by other artists. Jason Aldean released "The Truth" as a single from his 2009 album Wide Open. Lee Ann Womack released "There Is a God" in November 2009, though it was not subsequently featured on an album.

Track listing
"Broken In" (Rhett Akins, Ben Hayslip, Gary Loyd) - 3:38
"Dry County" (Rodney Clawson, Trent Willmon) - 3:12
"It Doesn't Mean I Don't Love You" (Bobby Pinson, Jeremy Spillman, Willmon) - 3:08
"Cold Beer and a Fishin' Pole" (Casey Beathard, Phil O'Donnell) - 4:00
"The Way I Remember It" (Clawson) - 4:01
"The Good Ol' Days Are Gone" (Brandon Kinney, Willmon) - 3:01
"How a Cowboy Lives" (Pinson, Spillman, Willmon) - 5:02
"The Truth" (Brett James, Ashley Monroe) - 3:47
"Little Set of Horns" (Spillman, Willmon) - 3:13
"Tumbleweed Town" (Kinney, Willmon) - 4:40
"I'll Love You Anyway" (Willmon) - 3:32
"There Is a God" (Chris DuBois, Ashley Gorley) - 6:41
"There Is a God" (multimedia track)

Chart performance

References

External links
[ Broken In] at Allmusic

2008 albums
Trent Willmon albums
Compadre Records albums